This is a list of flag bearers who have represented Belize at the Olympics.

Flag bearers carry the national flag of their country at the opening ceremony of the Olympic Games.

See also
Belize at the Olympics

References

Belize at the Olympics
Belize
Olympic